Carl Rogers (1902–1987), was an American psychologist.

Carl Rogers may also refer to:

 Carl Rogers (cricketer) (born 1970), English cricketer
Carlrogers, minor planet

See also
 Carl Rogers Darnall (1867–1941), U.S. Army chemist and surgeon